Louis, Dauphin of Auvergne may refer to:

Louis I, Count of Montpensier, Dauphin of Auvergne
Louis II, Count of Montpensier, Dauphin of Auvergne, grandson of the previous

See also
 Louis, Dauphin of France (disambiguation)